Arvīds is a Latvian masculine given name and may refer to:
Arvīds Bārda (1901–1940), Latvian footballer
Arvīds Brastiņš (1893–1984), Latvian sculptor, writer and neopagan leader
Arvīds Brēdermanis (1900–1970), Latvian official and founder of the Latvian Scouting movement
Arvīds Immermanis (1912–1947), Latvian cyclist and Olympic competitor 
Arvīds Jansons (1914–1984,) Latvian conductor
Arvīds Jurgens (1905–1955), Latvian footballer, ice hockey, basketball and bandy player 
Arvīds Ķibilds (1895–1980), Latvian track and field athlete
Arvīds Ozols-Bernē (1888–19??), Latvian track and field  athlete 
Arvīds Pelše (1899–1983), Latvian Soviet politician, functionary, and historian
Arvīds Reķis (born 1979), Latvian ice hockey defenceman 
Arvīds Tālavs (1906–1992), Latvian chess player

Latvian masculine given names